The 2018 AFC Cup knockout stage was played from 7 May to 27 October 2018. A total of 11 teams competed in the knockout stage to decide the champions of the 2018 AFC Cup.

Qualified teams
The following teams advanced from the group stage:
The winners of each of the three groups and the best runners-up in the West Asia Zone (Groups A–C) and the ASEAN Zone (Groups F–H) advanced to the Zonal semi-finals.
The winners of each group in the Central Asia Zone (Group D), the South Asia Zone (Group E), and the East Asia Zone (Group I) advanced to the Inter-zone play-off semi-finals.

Format

In the knockout stage, the 11 teams played a single-elimination tournament. Each tie was played on a home-and-away two-legged basis, except the final which was played as a single match. The away goals rule (for two-legged ties), extra time (away goals do not apply in extra time) and penalty shoot-out were used to decide the winner if necessary (Regulations Article 11.3).

Schedule
The schedule of each round was as follows (W: West Asia Zone; A: ASEAN Zone). Matches in the West Asia Zone were played on Mondays and Tuesdays, while matches in the ASEAN Zone and the Inter-zone play-offs were played on Tuesdays and Wednesdays.

Bracket
The bracket of the knockout stage was determined as follows:

The bracket was decided after the draw for the Zonal finals and the Inter-zone play-off semi-finals, which was held on 23 May 2018, 15:00 MYT (UTC+8), at the AFC House in Kuala Lumpur, Malaysia.

Zonal semi-finals

Summary

In the Zonal semi-finals, the four qualified teams from the West Asia Zone (Groups A–C) played in two ties, and the four qualified teams from the ASEAN Zone (Groups F–H) played in two ties, with the matchups and order of legs determined by the group stage draw and the identity of the best runners-up.

|+West Asia Zone

|+ASEAN Zone

West Asia Zone

Al-Jazeera won 2–1 on aggregate.

Al-Quwa Al-Jawiya won 5–3 on aggregate.

ASEAN Zone

Home United won 6–3 on aggregate.

Ceres–Negros won 6–5 on aggregate.

Zonal finals

Summary

The draw for the Zonal finals was held on 23 May 2018. In the Zonal finals, the two winners of West Asia Zonal semi-finals played each other, and the two winners of ASEAN Zonal semi-finals played each other, with the order of legs decided by draw. The winners of the West Asia Zonal final advanced to the final, while the winners of the ASEAN Zonal final advanced to the Inter-zone play-off semi-finals.

|+West Asia Zone

|+ASEAN Zone

West Asia Zone

Al-Quwa Al-Jawiya won 4–1 on aggregate.

ASEAN Zone

Home United won 3–1 on aggregate.

Inter-zone play-off semi-finals

Summary

The draw for the Inter-zone play-off semi-finals was held on 23 May 2018. In the Inter-zone play-off semi-finals, the four zonal winners other than the West Asia Zone played in two ties, i.e., the winners of the Central Asia Zone (Group D), the winners of the South Asia Zone (Group E), the winners of the East Asia Zone (Group I), and the winners of the ASEAN Zonal final (whose identity was not known at the time of the draw), with the matchups and order of legs decided by draw, without any seeding.

Matches

April 25 won 11–1 on aggregate.

Altyn Asyr won 5–2 on aggregate.

Inter-zone play-off final

Summary

In the Inter-zone play-off final, the two winners of the Inter-zone play-off semi-finals played each other, with the order of legs determined by the Inter-zone play-off semi-final draw. The winners of the Inter-zone play-off final advanced to the final.

Matches

3–3 on aggregate. Altyn Asyr won on away goals.

Final

In the final, the winners of the West Asia Zonal final and the winners of the Inter-zone play-off final played each other, with the host team (winners of the West Asia Zonal final) alternated from the previous season's final.

References

External links
, the-AFC.com
AFC Cup 2018, stats.the-AFC.com

3
May 2018 sports events in Asia
August 2018 sports events in Asia
September 2018 sports events in Asia
October 2018 sports events in Asia